Boletus loyo is a species of bolete fungus in the family Boletaceae that is found in South America. It was described as new to science by Carlos Luigi Spegazzini in 1912, who made the first scientifically documented collections in Argentina. The bolete is edible.

See also
 List of Boletus species

References

External links

loyo
Edible fungi
Fungi described in 1912
Fungi of South America
Taxa named by Carlo Luigi Spegazzini